P.J. Morton (born Paul Morton Jr.; March 29, 1981) is an American Grammy winning musician, singer, songwriter and record producer. Since 2012, he has been the keyboardist for the pop rock band Maroon 5. Morton originally joined the band as a touring member in 2010 and became an official member in 2012 after Jesse Carmichael went on indefinite hiatus (he returned to the lineup playing rhythm guitar in 2014).

Morton released his debut solo EP, Following My First Mind, in March 2012, through the record label Young Money. Adam Levine and James Valentine were featured on the lead single, "Heavy". In May 2013, Morton released his first major-label debut album, New Orleans. In 2016, he released his mixtape Bounce & Soul Vol. 1 in March and the Sticking to My Guns EP in July. On April 14, 2017, Morton released his first self-released studio album Gumbo, earning Morton two Grammy Award nominations for Best R&B Album and Best R&B Song at the 60th Annual Grammy Awards.

In April 2019, Morton said he would begin a project to restore the New Orleans home of jazz pioneer Buddy Bolden and create a museum and community space at the site. Bolden's former home has been owned by Morton's father's church for more than a decade, and had been cited for demolition by neglect.

Early life and education

Morton was born in New Orleans, Louisiana. His father is Canadian-born American gospel singer and Founder of the Full Gospel Baptist Church Fellowship, Bishop Paul S. Morton. His mother is Dr. Debra Brown Morton, pastor of Greater St. Stephen Full Gospel Baptist Church.

Morton graduated St. Augustine High School and majored in marketing at Morehouse College, graduating in 2003.

Career

Maroon 5
In 2010, Morton's friend and Maroon 5's musical director Adam Blackstone asked him to audition for a position in the band as a touring keyboardist and backing vocalist. Morton was the first to audition and left an indelible mark on the group. Since then, he has played with Maroon 5 in concerts and other live performances. From 2012 to 2014 Morton filled-in for the band's keyboardist, Jesse Carmichael, who was on an indefinite hiatus from performing with the group, as stated on their official website in March 2012. In 2012, he joined the band as a full-time member, contributing his vocal and keyboard parts on Maroon 5's fourth studio album, Overexposed, and continuing to do so during the processes of recording the band's albums, V (2014), Red Pill Blues (2017), and Jordi (2021).

Signing to Young Money and New Orleans

Morton's solo work won the attention of Mack Maine, who signed him to his production company, Soothe Your Soul, and Young Money Entertainment in 2011. The Following My First Mind (EP) was released on March 27, 2012.

On May 14, 2013, Morton released his major-label debut studio album with Young Money Records, titled New Orleans. The album's lead single, "Only One", which features Stevie Wonder, was nominated for the Best R&B Song at the 56th Annual Grammy Awards in 2014.

Gumbo and Paul

In 2016, Morton moved to New Orleans and opened a record label called Morton Records which he envisioned as "the New Orleans Motown". Same year, Morton started working on Gumbo. About the album's title he said "I named it Gumbo because the actual dish is a bunch of things mixed in together to make [something] beautiful. I wanted to grow as a songwriter and talk about more things ... about where we are in the world today, the tension, how divided we are as a country. It kind of felt like I was dumping a bunch of subject matter together and I made it in New Orleans so that sounded like gumbo to me." As a first step, on March 25, 2016, Morton released Bounce & Soul Vol. 1, a mixtape which includes re-imagined versions of his best songs in New Orleans' bounce style. On July 1, 2016, Morton released the Sticking to My Guns EP, featuring the single of the same name. The EP, besides including alternative versions of "First Began" and "Sticking to My Guns", also contains "Say So", a song that was later cut from the final tracklist of the album. On November 15, 2016, Morton released "You Should Be Ashamed", a Stevie Wonder-esque socially conscious song that was later replaced by "Religion". On March 13, 2017, Morton announced on his Instagram page April 14, 2017 as the release date of Gumbo.

Gumbo did not manage to enter on the US Billboard 200 chart but received positive reviews from most music critics, who complimented Morton's style and praised him for his singing and songwriting. The album earned Morton two Grammy nominations for Best R&B Album and Best R&B Song at the 60th Annual Grammy Awards. On February 14, 2019, Morton collaborated with singer JoJo on the song "Say So", which served as the lead single for his sixth album Paul.

Other work

After winning Grammy Awards for his songwriting and production on India.Arie's Interested, Morton won Dove and Stellar Awards in 2008.

Morton was also noticed by AR Rahman, composer for Slumdog Millionaire, who asked Morton to contribute "Sajna" to the soundtrack and movie for the Vince Vaughn comedy Couples Retreat. Morton has also produced and written for musicians such as Jermaine Dupri, LL Cool J, Jagged Edge, Monica, India.Arie, gospel musicians Fred Hammond, Men of Standard, Brian Courtney Wilson, and Heather Headley. In 2009, he published a book entitled Why Can't I Sing About Love?

Morton who wrote a song called "Battle Field" by Chinese singer Jane Zhang from the 2016 film The Great Wall.

Personal life 
He married his wife Kortni Morton on December 25, 2008. They grew up attending the same church and began dating as adults. They have three children.

Filmography

Composer

Discography

As solo artist

Studio albums
 Emotions (2005)
 Walk Alone (2010)
 New Orleans (2013)
 Gumbo (2017)
 Christmas with PJ Morton (2018)
 Paul (2019)
 Gospel According to PJ: From the Songbook of PJ Morton (2020)
 Watch the Sun (2022)

Live albums
 Live from LA (2008)
 Live Show Killer (2015)
 Gumbo Unplugged (2018)
 The Piano Album (2020)

Mixtape
 Bounce & Soul Volume 1 (2016)

EPs
 Following My First Mind (2012)
 Sticking to My Guns (2016)

With the PJ Morton Band
 Perfect Song (2007)

With Maroon 5
Overexposed (2012)
V (2014)
Red Pill Blues (2017)
Jordi (2021)

Remixes
2017
 "The Cat Looks at the King (PJ Morton Remix)" – Collapsing Scenery featuring Good Joon and Buddy

Awards and nominations
Grammy Awards

|-
|rowspan=2|2013
|"Payphone"
|Best Pop Duo/Group Performance
|
|-
|Overexposed
|Best Pop Vocal Album
|
|-
|2014
|"Only One"
|Best R&B Song
|
|-
|2016
|"Sugar"
|Best Pop Duo/Group Performance
|
|-
|rowspan=2|2018
|Gumbo
|Best R&B Album
|
|-
|rowspan=2|"First Began"
|Best R&B Song
|
|-
|rowspan=4|2019
|Best R&B Performance
|
|-
|"Girls Like You"
|Best Pop Duo/Group Performance
|
|-
|"How Deep Is Your Love"
|Best Traditional R&B Performance
|
|-
|Gumbo Unplugged
|Best R&B Album
|
|-
|rowspan=3|2020
|"Say So"
|Best R&B Song
|
|-
|"Built for Love"
|Best Traditional R&B Performance
|
|-
|Paul
|Best R&B Album
|
|-
|2021
|Gospel According to PJ: From the Songbook of PJ Morton
|Best Gospel Album
|
|-
|rowspan=2|2022
|"Bring It On Home To Me"
|Best Traditional R&B Performance
|
|-
|We Are
|Album of the Year
|
|-
|rowspan=2|2023
|"Please Don't Walk Away"
|Best R&B Song
|
|-
|Watch the Sun
|Best R&B Album
|
|}

References

External links
 
 

1981 births
Grammy Award winners
Living people
St. Augustine High School (New Orleans) alumni
Morehouse College alumni
Maroon 5 members
Musicians from New Orleans
Young Money Entertainment artists
21st-century American composers
American soul singers
American male singer-songwriters
African-American male singers
Cash Money Records artists
Rhythm and blues musicians from New Orleans
American rhythm and blues singer-songwriters
21st-century American keyboardists
21st-century American singers
African-American songwriters
Singer-songwriters from Louisiana